Gowri Nandha is an Indian actress who works in Malayalam, Tamil, and Telugu film industries. She was noted for her role in the 2020 movie Ayyappanum Koshiyum.

Filmography

References

External links
 

1989 births
Living people
Actresses in Malayalam cinema
Actresses in Tamil cinema
Actresses in Telugu cinema